Towan is a locality located in the 'Murray-Mallee' Ward of the Rural City of Swan Hill, Victoria, Australia. Towan post office opened on 15 October 1915 and was closed on the 17 July 1962.

References

Towns in Victoria (Australia)
Rural City of Swan Hill